Van Collers Pass is situated in the Limpopo Province on the road between Alldays and Waterpoort (South Africa).

Skill level: Intermediate

Road Condition: Gravel surface

Remarks:Beautiful views, sharp turns, precipitous edge

Mountain passes of Limpopo